Bowers may refer to:

Persons
Bowers (surname)

Places
Antarctica
 Bowers Mountains
 Bowers Piedmont Glacier

United Kingdom
 Bowers, Staffordshire, England
 Bowers Gifford, Essex, England

United States
 Bowers, Delaware
 Bowers, Indiana
 Bowers, Pennsylvania
 Bowers, Wisconsin
 Bowers House (disambiguation), several structures
 Bowers Museum, Santa Ana, California
 Bowers Stadium, Sam Houston University, Texas

Other uses
 Bowers & Wilkins, a loudspeaker company in the United Kingdom
 USS Bowers (DE-637)
 Bowers v. Hardwick, a 1986 U.S. Supreme Court decision
 Bowers v. Kerbaugh-Empire Co., a 1926 U.S. Supreme Court decision
 Bowers Coaches, a bus company based in the High Peak area of Derbyshire in England
 Bowers' operators, a way to write large numbers
 Betty Bowers, a fictional character

See also
 Bauer (disambiguation)
 Bower (disambiguation)